First Baptist Church is a historic Baptist church located at 1100 Court Street, Lynchburg, Virginia.  It is built of hard-pressed red brick on a rough granite foundation.  The main facade of the church, facing Eleventh Street, and the two sides are centered with large rose windows framed within Gothic arches covered with hood moldings.  Construction began in 1884 and the church was dedicated in 1886.  In the 1920s, Lynchburg architect Stanhope S. Johnson designed the complementary Sunday School annex.  In 1941, the interior of the sanctuary was modified by Stanhope S. Johnson, with the creation of a divided chancel. It is home to the oldest Baptist congregation of Lynchburg, established in July 1815. Current as of 2020, First Baptist Church is affiliated with the Cooperative Baptist Fellowship (CBF).

It was listed on the National Register of Historic Places in 1982.  It is located in the Court House Hill-Downtown Historic District.

Gallery

References

External links
 fbclva.org Lynchburg First Baptist Church website
 First Baptist Church, Court & Eleventh Streets, Lynchburg, Lynchburg, VA at the Historic American Buildings Survey (HABS)

19th-century Baptist churches in the United States
Baptist churches in Virginia
Churches on the National Register of Historic Places in Virginia
Gothic Revival church buildings in Virginia
Churches completed in 1886
Churches in Lynchburg, Virginia
National Register of Historic Places in Lynchburg, Virginia
Historic American Buildings Survey in Virginia
Individually listed contributing properties to historic districts on the National Register in Virginia
Southern Baptist Convention churches